Tokyo Reverie is a studio album by American jazz pianist Mal Waldron recorded solo in Tokyo in 1970 and released on the Japanese RCA Victor label.

Track listing
All compositions by Mal Waldron
 "Tokyo Daytime"  
 "A Touch Of Tokyo"  
 "Sayonara"  
 "The Brave Samurai"  
 "Hallelujah"  
 "Soul in Search"  
 "Variations on a Theme"  
 "Blood and Guts"  
Recorded in Tokyo, Japan on February 7, 1970.

Personnel
 Mal Waldron — piano

References

RCA Victor albums
Mal Waldron albums
1970 albums
Solo piano jazz albums